Christopher P. Haines is Emeritus Professor of Post-Harvest Technology at the Natural Resources Institute, University of Greenwich. Haines is a specialist on the ecology and management of pests of food commodities in tropical regions.
Haines is a past President of the Royal Entomological Society (2002–2004).

References

Fellows of the Royal Entomological Society
Presidents of the Royal Entomological Society
British entomologists
Living people
Year of birth missing (living people)